Martha Williamson is a television producer, best known as the head writer and executive producer of the long-running hit CBS television series Touched by an Angel.

Martha began her career in television working on musical variety programs for Carol Burnett, Walt Disney Television, and others. She wrote and produced for half-hour comedies such as the long-running The Facts of Life and The Family Man with Gregory Harrison. She made the transition to one-hour drama as producer of Jack's Place for ABC Television and Co-Executive Producer of the CBS series Under One Roof, which starred James Earl Jones. In 1994 she became the Executive Producer of Touched by an Angel. Currently, she is the creator of the TV series Signed, Sealed, Delivered, which has aired since October 2013 on the Hallmark Channel and on Hallmark Movies & Mysteries.

She was named in 2007 by her publisher as one of the "12 Most Powerful Christians in Hollywood." She became the first woman to solely produce two network television dramas simultaneously.

Touched by an Angel was nominated for nine Emmy Awards and was inducted into the Museum of Television and Radio Hall of Fame. It has been translated into more than sixty languages and continues to be broadcast around the world.

She hosts A Touch of Encouragement on Beliefnet.com.

Her awards include the Freedom Works Award from the U.S. Congress, the Edward R. Murrow Responsibility in Television Award, the Producers Guild Nova Award, the Templeton Prize, as well as honors from the Anti-Defamation League, the NAACP, the Salvation Army, Catholics in Media.
She was appointed to the President's White House Council on Service and Civic Participation.

A native of Colorado, Martha lives in Southern California with her husband, Jon Andersen, and their two children. She is a graduate of Williams College.

Television series

Books

Soundtracks

Awards

References

Sources

1955 births
Living people
Writers from Denver
American television producers
American women television producers
American television writers
Screenwriters from Colorado
American women television writers
Williams College alumni